Dezső Lemhényi (né Kollmann, December 9, 1917 – December 4, 2003) was a Hungarian water polo player who competed at the 1948 Summer Olympics and 1952 Summer Olympics.

He was born and died in Budapest. He was the husband of Olga Tass.

Lemhényi was part of the Hungarian team which won the silver medal at the 1948 tournament. He played six matches and scored three goals.

Four years later he was a member of the Hungarian team which won the gold medal at the 1952 Olympic tournament. He played two matches and scored five goals.

He is one of a few sportspeople who won Olympic medals in water polo as players and head coaches. He was inducted into the International Swimming Hall of Fame.

See also
 Hungary men's Olympic water polo team records and statistics
 List of Olympic champions in men's water polo
 List of Olympic medalists in water polo (men)
 List of members of the International Swimming Hall of Fame

References

External links
 

1917 births
2003 deaths
Water polo players from Budapest
Hungarian male water polo players
Water polo players at the 1948 Summer Olympics
Water polo players at the 1952 Summer Olympics
Olympic gold medalists for Hungary in water polo
Olympic silver medalists for Hungary in water polo
Medalists at the 1952 Summer Olympics
Medalists at the 1948 Summer Olympics
Hungarian water polo coaches